Ilham Shahmuradov (born 1 January 1958) is the Azerbaijan National Academy of Sciences Head of Bioinformatics laboratory in ANAS Botany Institute, professor of Department of Medical Biology and Genetics in the Azerbaijan Medical Universitydoctor of biological sciences, Curator of the Bioinformatics courses in the Departments of Biology, Ecology and Solil Sciences, Baku State University, corresponding member of Azerbaijan National Academy of Sciences

Life 
Shahmuradov: PhD (Genetics, 1987; Institute of Cytology and Genetics, Academy  of  Sciences of the (former) USSR, Siberian Branch, Russia) and Doctor of Sciences (Genetics, 2005; Institute of Botany, Azerbaijan National Academy of Sciences, ANAS).

Professor, Department of Medical Biology and Genetics, Azerbaijan Medical University (2013 – 2014), Foreign Professor, Department of Biosciences, COMSATS Institute of Information Technology, Islamabad, Pakistan (2007-2010),  Head of Bioinformatics Laboratory, Institute of Botany, Azerbaijan National Academy of Sciences (ANAS), Baku, Azerbaijan  (2002 – present), Researcher, Department of Computer Science, Royal Holloway, University of London, Egham, UK (2001-2004), Visiting scientist, Bioinformatics Department, Helix Research Institute, Kisarazu, Japan (2000-2001), Head of Group of Mathematical Modeling, Institute of Botany, ANAS (1989 – 2000), Researcher, Department of Molecular-Genetic Bases of Production Processes, Institute of Botany, ANAS (1987–1989).

Area of scientific interest
structure and evolution of eukaryotic genomes; Organization and expression of genes in eukaryotic genomes; Organelle-to-nucleus gene transfer in plants; Development of bioinformatics tools and databases.

Membership with international and foreign scientific organizations 
 Secretary General of the Azerbaijan Society of Biochemists and Molecular Biologists
 Member of the Azerbaijan National Committee of "Bioethics,  Ethics of Science and Technologies" under the UNESCO

Bibliography

 Shahmuradov IA, Abdulazimova A.U., Aliyev JA, Qamar R, Chohan S, Solovyev VV (2010) Mono- and Bi-Cistronic Chimeric mRNAs in Arabidopsis and Rice Genomes. Applied and Computational Mathematics, 9, 19-33
 Akbarova YA, Shahmuradov IA, Solovyev VV (2010) Possible Functional and Evolutionary Role of Plastid DNA Insertions in Rice. Applied and Computational Mathematics 2010, 9, 66-81

 Shahmuradov IA, Solovyev VV (2003)  PromH: promoters identification using orthologous genomic sequences. Nucl. Acids. Res., 31, 3540–3545
 Shahmuradov IA, Akbarova YYu,  Solovyev VV, Aliyev JA  (2003) Abundance of plastid DNA insertions in nuclear genomes rice and Arabidopsis.  Plant Molecular Biology, 52, 923-934
 Gordon L, Chervonenkis AYa, Gammerman A.J., Shahmuradov IA, Solovyev VV (2003). Sequence alignment kernel for recognition of promoter regions. Bioinformatics, 19, 1964–1971
 Kapitonov VV, Shakhmuradov IA, Kolchanov NA (1989) Evolution of  Alu  repeats:  Imitation  model.  Genetics (USSR/Russia), 25,1111-1118
 Shakhmuradov IA, Kapitonov VV, Kolchanov NA, Omelyanchuk LV (1989). Evolution of Alu repeats: Dynamics of propagation in genome. Genetics (USSR/Russia), 25, 1682-1689
 Kolchanov NA, Shakhmuradov IA, Kapitonov VV, Omelyanchuk LV (1988) Evolutionary aspects of the  mammalian  Alu repeats. Molecular Biology (USSR/Russia), 22, 1335-1344
 Kapitonov VV, Kolchanov NA, Shakhmuradov IA, Solovyev VV (1987) The existence of the sites  homological to the regulatory site of  heat-shock  in mobile  genetic elements. Genetics (USSR/Russia), 12, 2112-2119
 Bogachev SS, Blinov AG, Blinov VM, Gaidamakova EK, Kolesnikov NN,  Kiknadze II,  Shakhmuradov IA (1986) Some structural elements in DNA sequence from Balbiani ring of IV Chromosome of  Chironomus thummi. Proceedings of Academy of Sciences of (former) USSR (now Russia), 288, 230-233
 Shakhmuradov IA, Kolchanov NA, Solovyev VV, Ratner VA (1986) Enhancer-like structures  in middle repetitive DNA elements of  eukaryotic genomes. Genetics (USSR/Russia), 22, 357-367

References

External links 
 https://web.archive.org/web/20141017204526/http://science.ab.az/forms/chlenyikorrespondentyi/1583

Academic staff of Azerbaijan Medical University
Azerbaijani physicians
1958 births
Living people
Bioinformaticians